58th New York Film Critics Circle Awards
January 17, 1993

Best Picture:
 The Player 
The 58th New York Film Critics Circle Awards honored the best filmmaking of 1992. The winners were announced on 17 December 1992 and the awards were given on 17 January 1993.

Winners
Best Actor:
Denzel Washington - Malcolm X
Runners-up: Harvey Keitel - Bad Lieutenant and Al Pacino - Scent of a Woman
Best Actress:
Emma Thompson - Howards End
Runners-up: Susan Sarandon - Lorenzo's Oil and Michelle Pfeiffer - Love Field
Best Cinematography:
Jean Lépine - The Player
Runners-up: Jean de Segonzac - Laws of Gravity and Zhao Fei - Raise the Red Lantern (Da hong deng long gao gao gua)
Best Director:
Robert Altman - The Player
Runners-up: Clint Eastwood - Unforgiven and James Ivory - Howards End
Best Documentary:
Brother's Keeper
Runners-up: American Dream and A Brief History of Time
Best Film:
The Player
Runners-up: Unforgiven and Howards End
Best Foreign Language Film:
Raise the Red Lantern (Da hong deng long gao gao gua) • China/Hong Kong/Taiwan
Runners-up: The Match Factory Girl (Tulitikkutehtaan tyttö) • Finland/Sweden and Indochine • France
Best New Director:
Allison Anders - Gas Food Lodging
Runners-up: Quentin Tarantino - Reservoir Dogs and Tim Robbins - Bob Roberts
Best Screenplay:
Neil Jordan - The Crying Game
Runners-up: Michael Tolkin - The Player and David Webb Peoples - Unforgiven
Best Supporting Actor:
Gene Hackman - Unforgiven
Runners-up: Seymour Cassel - In the Soup and Jack Nicholson - A Few Good Men
Best Supporting Actress:
Miranda Richardson - The Crying Game, Enchanted April and Damage
Runners-up: Judy Davis - Husbands and Wives and Alfre Woodard - Passion Fish

References

External links
1992 Awards

1992
New York Film Critics Circle Awards
New York Film Critics Circle Awards
New York Film Critics Circle Awards
New York Film Critics Circle Awards
New York Film Critics Circle Awards